This is a list of snack foods in alphabetical order by type and name. A snack is a small portion of food eaten between meals. They may be simple, prepackaged items, raw fruits or vegetables or more complicated dishes but they are traditionally considered less than a full meal.

Batter and dough-based

Many cultures have dishes that are prepared by cooking batter and deep frying dough in many various forms.

Confectionery

Confectionery is related to food items that are rich in sugar and often referred to as confections. Confectionery refers to the art of creating sugar based dessert forms, or subtleties (subtlety or sotelty), often with pastillage.

Cookies, cakes and pastries

Cookies

Cakes

Pastries

Drinks

Frozen

Natural snacks

Fruits and vegetables

 Apple
 Banana
 Banana boats a traditional campfire treat consisting of a banana cut lengthwise and stuffed with marshmallow and chocolate, then wrapped in aluminium foil and cooked in the embers left over from a campfire
 Carrot
 Celery
 Cherries
 Crudités  platters of chopped vegetables usually served with dips
 Dried apple  Czech snack "křížaly"
 Dried fruit dehydrated
 Fruit roll
 Grapes
 Honeydew
 Kiwi
 Orange
 Peach
 Plums
 Raisins 
 Salsa
 Strawberries
 Tostones also known as tostón, they are made from sliced green (unripe) plantains cut either length-wise or width-wise and are twice fried
 Watermelon

Seeds, nuts, grains and legumes

 Almonds
 Cashews
 Cereal bar 
 Coconut
 Granola
 Leblebi
 Macadamia nuts
 Mixed nuts
 Nuts
 Party mix 
 Peanuts and honey-roasted peanuts
 Pine nuts
 Pistachio
 Popcorn
 Pumpkin seeds
 Rice cake
 Soy nuts
 Sunflower seeds
 Trail mix, gorp, scroggin
 Walnuts

Savory snacks

Bars

Bread/sandwiches

Cheese

Chips/crisps

Crackers/biscuits

Meat-based

Noodles

See also

 Junk food
 List of Indian snacks
 List of Indonesian snacks
 List of Japanese snacks
 List of pastries
 List of snack foods by country
 List of street foods
 Moroccan cuisine
 Snacking

References

Bibliography
 Booth, R. Gordon (editor) (1990). Snack Food. Springer. 
 
 Croll, Elisabeth (2006). China's New Consumers: Social Development and Domestic Demand. Routledge. 
 Hu, Frank (2008). Obesity Epidemiology. Oxford University Press. 
 Lusas, Edmund W. Lusas; Rooney, Lloyd W. (editors) (2001). Snack Foods Processing CRC Press. 
 Reineccius, Gary (2005). Flavor Chemistry and Technology, Second Edition. CRC Press. p 405. 
 Tull, Anita (2012). Food Technology: An Introduction. Oxford University Press. Pages 40–41. 

Convenience foods
Snack foods